Scincella cherriei, commonly known as the brown forest skink and Cope's brown forest skink, is a species of lizard in the family Scincidae. The species is native to Central America and adjacent southeastern Mexico. Three subspecies are recognized.

Etymology
The specific name, cherriei, is in honor of George Kruck Cherrie, who was an American naturalist and ornithologist.

The subspecific name, stuarti, is in honor of American herpetologist Laurence Cooper Stuart.

Geographic range
S. cherriei is found in Belize, Costa Rica, El Salvador, Guatemala, Honduras, Mexico (Puebla, Quintana Roo, Tabasco, Veracruz, Yucatán), and Nicaragua.

Habitat

Diet
S. cherriei preys upon small invertebrates.

Reproduction
S. cherriei is oviparous.

Subspecies
The following three subspecies are recognized as being valid, including the nominotypical subspecies.
Scincella cherriei cherriei 
Scincella cherriei ixbaac 
Scincella cherriei stuarti 

Nota bene: A trinomial authority in parentheses indicates that the subspecies was originally described in a genus other than Scincella.

References

Further reading
Cope ED (1893). "Second Addition to the Knowledge of the Batrachia and Reptilia of Costa Rica". Proceedings of the American Philosophical Society  31: 333–347. (Mocoa cherriei, new species, pp. 340–341).
Savage JM (2002). The Amphibians and Reptiles of Costa Rica: A Herpetofauna between Two Continents, between Two Seas. Chicago and London: University of Chicago Press. 954 pp. .
Smith HM (1941). "A New Race of Lygosoma from Mexico". Proceedings of the Biological Society of Washington 54: 181–182. (Lygosoma cherriei stuarti, new subspecies).
Stuart LC (1940). "Notes on the Lampropholis group of Middle American Lygosoma (Scincidae) with descriptions of two new forms". Occasional Papers of the Museum of Zoology, University of Michigan (421): 1–16. (Lygosoma assatum ixbaac, new subspecies, pp. 8–10).

Scincella
Reptiles described in 1893
Taxa named by Edward Drinker Cope